Events from the year 1836 in France.

Incumbents
 Monarch – Louis Philippe I

Events
 29 July - The Arc de Triomphe in Paris is inaugurated.
 Eugène Schneider and his brother Adolphe Schneider purchase a bankrupt ironworks near the town of Le Creusot in the Burgundy region and found the steelworks and engineering company Schneider Frères & Cie.

Births
3 January - Marie François Oscar Bardy de Fourtou, politician (died 1897)
14 January - Henri Fantin-Latour, painter and lithographer (died 1904)
21 February - Léo Delibes, composer (died 1891)
26 March - Mélanie de Pourtalès, salonnière and courtier (died 1914) 
31 May - Jules Chéret, painter and lithographer (died 1932)
26 June - Émile Étienne Guimet, industrialist, traveller and connoisseur (died 1918)
4 October - Juliette Adam, writer (died 1936)
15 October - James Tissot, painter (died 1902)
20 December - Alfred Grandidier, naturalist and explorer (died 1921)

Full date unknown
Jean Pierre Philippe Lampué, photographer (died 1924)

Deaths
9 January - Pierre François Lacenaire, poet and murderer (born 1800)
21 January - André Étienne d'Audebert de Férussac, naturalist (born 1786)
7 March - Français of Nantes, politician and author (born 1756)
10 June - André-Marie Ampère, physicist (born 1775)
26 June - Claude Joseph Rouget de Lisle, composer, writer of La Marseillaise (born 1760)
23 July - Jean-Félix Adolphe Gambart, astronomer (born 1800)
25 July - Armand Carrel, writer (born 1800)
21 August - Claude-Louis Navier, engineer and physicist (born 1785)
17 September - Antoine Laurent de Jussieu, botanist (born 1748)
30 November - Pierre Girard, mathematician and engineer (born 1765)

References

1830s in France